Kevin Krawietz and Albano Olivetti were the defending champions but lost in the first round to Tomasz Bednarek and David Pel.

Sander Arends and Antonio Šančić won the title after defeating Jeremy Jahn and Edan Leshem 6–2, 5–7, [13–11] in the final.

Seeds

Draw

References
 Main Draw

Sparkassen ATP Challenger - Doubles
2017 Doubles